The Crippen Point site is a Coles Creek culture archaeological site located in Sharkey County, Mississippi. It is the archaeological type site of the Crippen Point phase (1050 to 1200 CE) for Late Coles Creek culture in the Lower Mississippi valley. The phase marks a significant change in the cultural history of the area. Population increased dramatically and there is strong evidence of a growing cultural and political complexity by this portion of the Coles Creek sequence. Although many of the classic traits of chiefdom societies are not yet manifested, by 1000 CE the formation of simple elite polities had begun. Sites for this phase are found in Arkansas, Louisiana, Oklahoma, Mississippi, and Texas. After the Crippen Point phase the Plaquemine culture period begins.

See also
 Kings Crossing site
 Winterville site
 Woodland period

References

External links

Archaeological sites of the Coles Creek culture
Archaeological sites in Mississippi
Geography of Sharkey County, Mississippi
Archaeological type sites